Camila Rolón (18 July 1842 – 16 February 1913) - in religious Camila of Saint Joseph - was an Argentine Roman Catholic professed religious and the founder of the Poor Sisters of Saint Joseph. Rolón survived a cholera outbreak in Buenos Aires in the 1870s that claimed her mother and brother and after this made two failed attempts to enter the Capuchin Poor Clares and the Carmelites. In 1880 she moved to Mercedes where she founded an orphanage that would later evolve into a religious congregation. Her order spread to the point that the motherhouse relocated to Rome as did she and it was there that she died.

Her beatification process opened in 1950 despite the fact that the cause was not introduced on a formal level until 1975. In 1993 she became titled as Venerable after Pope John Paul II confirmed that Rolón had practiced heroic virtue during her life.

Life
Camila Rolón was born in San Isidro on 18 July 1842 to Eusebio Rolón and María Gutíerrez; her baptism was celebrated on 22 July and she was baptized in the names "Corina Camila". Her parents named her in honor of Saint Camilo de Lelis. Rolón received her Confirmation when she was seven from Bishop Mariano Escalada and then made her First Communion in 1854.

In 1867 a cholera epidemic broke out in Buenos Aires and after it disappeared the Yellow Fever spread throughout the region. This new outbreak claimed the life of her mother in 1870 while her brother Andrés died not long following this. From the age of eighteen she had felt a strong call to the religious life and so set herself on joining the Capuchin Poor Clares in Buenos Aires. Rolón tried entering in 1886 but failed. This came after a previous and failed attempt to join the Carmelites at their convent. Rolón entered the order on 21 April 1875 and assumed the religious name "Dolores de San José" but ill health (which the rigors of convent life caused to worsen) forced her to leave the order on 20 May to spend five months recuperating at her home. Her father died not long after this in mid-1877.

Rolón - on 28 January 1880 - moved out of her father's home alongside two friends and eleven orphaned girls to Mercedes in order to found an orphanage there and to pursue their religious dreams where the group settled in an old house. The rich benefactor Leon Gallardo heard about her venture and so promised that he would establish a building to serve as the fledgling order's motherhouse which was established in 1889 in Muñiz. Rolón founded the Poor Sisters of Saint Joseph in Mercedes and went on to establish 32 houses and two novitiate houses.

On 19 March 1881 she and three others assumed the religious habit for the first time and she later made her initial profession on 19 March 1882. Rolón arrived in Rome on 7 May 1891 alongside two companions on a mission to obtain papal approval for her institute. It was there she spoke with Cardinal Mariano Rampolla who approved of her idea and assured her that he would do whatever he could to get the pope to approve it. The cardinal also managed to secure her and her companions a private audience with Pope Leo XIII. Rolón threw herself at the pope's feet which she kissed and the pope promised her that he would issue the papal decree of praise for the order.

Her return to Buenos Aires on 26 July 1891 saw her continue with her religious formation that culminated in her solemn profession as "Camila de San José" on 19 March 1892. Rolón served as the order's first Superior General and was re-elected as such on 19 March 1896; she later undertook another trip to Rome on 31 March 1903 and would return to Buenos Aires that July around the time that Pope Leo XIII died. Papal approval for her order was given before the pope's death on 3 May 1898. The nun returned to Rome on 30 November 1904 to meet with the new Pope Pius X in a private audience while later on 19 March 1908 was re-elected once more as Superior General before making a return trip to Rome in late 1908. The nun made another trip to Rome on 27 September 1910 and arrived there in late October.

The Constitutions for her order received approval from Pope Pius X on 15 December 1908 and so she travelled to Rome to have the pope approve her statutes. In 1910 the order's motherhouse was established in Rome where she would relocate.

In late 1911 she became ill and so was confined to her bed but it was later diagnosed as a carcinoma of the uterus (evolving into uterine cancer) that had first manifested in 1875 and was the reason for her departure from the Carmelites. Rolón rallied from this but her cancer returned sometime in 1912 forcing her to sign her spiritual testament on 27 September 1912 in preparation for her death. Her condition worsened on 10 October 1912 and she remained in bed for treatment though would move to an armchair when she had enough strength to move about. Rolón died in Rome at 12:20am holding a Crucifix in her hands. Her remains arrived in Buenos Aires on 22 March to the metropolitan cathedral and then were taken to Muñiz for interment. Her order now exists in countries such as Romania and Madagascar and in 2008 had 161 religious in 30 houses.

Beatification process
The beatification process for the late nun opened in both Rome and the La Plata diocese in an informative process that opened on 2 August 1950 and concluded later on 20 March 1952. Her spiritual writings were also collected as part of the investigation for theologians to examine; their aim was to discern whether her writings adhered to doctrine or not and a decree issued on 28 January 1959 confirmed her writings were approved. The formal introduction to the cause came under Pope Paul VI on 13 March 1975 while an apostolic process was later held from 8 June 1977 until 31 July 1978. The Congregation for the Causes of Saints later validated these processes in Rome on 13 November 1981 as having adhered to their regulations for causes.

The postulation - officials in charge of the cause - submitted the official Positio dossier to the C.C.S. in 1990 for investigation. This dossier was the culmination of the informative and apostolic process with biographical information and that information attesting to her holiness. Theologians approved the dossier on 23 June 1992 as did the C.C.S. members later on 12 January 1993. Rolón was declared to be Venerable on 2 April 1993 after Pope John Paul II confirmed that the late religious lived a life of heroic virtue.

The current postulator for the cause is Dr. Silvia Mónica Correale.

Her beatification depends upon papal confirmation of a miracle that is often a healing that science and medicine fail to explain. The diocese that one such healing originated in investigated the case and the process for this concluded on 5 August 2016. Cardinal Giovanni Angelo Becciu sent a letter to Bishop Santiago Olivera in 2019 stating that two medical experts had to meet to assess if the case was credible before sending it to the medical board for evaluation.

References

External links
 Hagiography Circle
 Official website

1842 births
1913 deaths
19th-century Argentine Roman Catholic nuns
20th-century Argentine Roman Catholic nuns
19th-century venerated Christians
20th-century venerated Christians
Founders of Catholic religious communities
People from Buenos Aires Province
Superiors general
Venerated Catholics by Pope John Paul II